Sphaerolbia is a genus of moth in the family Lecithoceridae. It contains the species Sphaerolbia chrematistis, which is found in India (Assam).

References

Natural History Museum Lepidoptera genus database

Lecithoceridae
Monotypic moth genera